Amaurodon aeruginascens is a species of fungus belonging to the family Thelephoraceae. It is native to Central America.

References

Thelephorales
Fungi described in 1988
Fungi of Central America
Taxa named by Leif Ryvarden